Frode Eike Hansen (born September 4, 1972 in Stavanger), is a former Norwegian professional footballer who played for Mosterøy, Vidar, Viking and Lyn. Hansen was above all a determined player and a strong tackler who gained a reputation as a no nonsense defender. He made his debut in the Norwegian Premier League for Viking in 1998, playing a total of 163 games in the Norwegian top flight for Viking and Lyn. His most notable achievements were the UEFA Cup first round matches against Sporting Lisboa in 1999, where Viking won 3-1 on aggregate.

Hansen rose to fame towards the end of his career, when he moved from being a hard-working, but underestimated defender to being recognised as one of the most important players in the Viking team. He was also forwarded by team mate Egil Østenstad as a player who ought to get more press due to his allegedly knowing more about wine and beer than any other Norwegian footballer and thus being the quintessential bohemian.

References

External links
Guardian's Stats Centre
Frode Eike Hansen at altomfotball.no

1972 births
Living people
Sportspeople from Stavanger
Norwegian footballers
Eliteserien players
FK Vidar players
Viking FK players
Lyn Fotball players
Association football defenders